The  Under-19 Quadrangular Series in India  was an Under-19  One Day International cricket tournament in the India that was held between Australia,  India,  South Africa and Zimbabwe. It was held between 23 September 2013 and 5 October 2013.

Venues
The matches were played at the Dr. Y.S. Rajasekhara Reddy ACA-VDCA Cricket Stadium, Visakhapatnam and also played at Port Trust Diamond Jubilee Stadium, Visakhapatnam.

Squads

Fixtures

Group stage

Points table

Round 1

South Africa won the toss and elected to bat.
JG Dill, AK Markram, AL Phehlukwayo and H van der Berg(South Africa) made their Youth ODI debuts.

India won the toss and elected to bat.
D Bell, J Gumbie, C Kwinje, D Nel and MS Nyathi(ZIM) made their Youth ODI debuts.

Australia won the toss and elected to bat.
J Myers(ZIM) made their Youth ODI debuts.

South Africa won the toss and elected to bat.
LJ Brown, D Galiem and L Ngidi (South Africa)made their Youth ODI debuts.

India won the toss and elected to bat.
JP Zope (IND)made their Youth ODI debuts.

South Africa won the toss and elected to field.
B Diplock and C Mumba (ZIM) made their Youth ODI debuts.

Round 2

3rd place play-off

Final

References 

Under-19
International cricket competitions in India